Ricky Diaco (born 6 June 1982) is an Australian footballer who currently plays for South Springvale.

Biography
An important turning point for Diaco's career was winning the VPL (Victorian Premier League) Gold Medal award for best player in the league in 2004 whilst at Frankston Pines (tying with Doug Mladenović of Altona Magic).

Prior to this Diaco had stints with Essendon Royals and Springvale White Eagles. For the 2005 VPL season Diaco made yet another move, joining Bulleen Zebras. However his tenure at the Veneto Club was short lived when his rapid improvement was rewarded with a contract at newly formed A-League team Melbourne Victory. Diaco has also represented Australia in Futsal.

Diaco was released by Melbourne Victory FC at the end of the 05/06 season and played the remainder of the 2006 VPL season with the Bulleen Zebras. During the 2007 pre-season he signed a 2-year contract for South Melbourne FC.  At the end of his 2-year contract with South Melbourne FC him and the club parted ways and he was signed by Oakleigh Cannons.

References

1982 births
Living people
Australian soccer players
A-League Men players
Springvale White Eagles FC players
Melbourne Victory FC players
South Melbourne FC players
Whittlesea Zebras players
Oakleigh Cannons FC players
Association football forwards
South Springvale SC players